Kilian Moser (born 29 July 1988 in Interlaken) is a Swiss professional racing cyclist.

Career wins

 2008 - UIV Cup Rotterdam, U23 (NED)

References

External links
 

1988 births
Living people
Swiss male cyclists
Swiss track cyclists
People from Interlaken
Sportspeople from the canton of Bern